Muffazal Lakdawala is an Indian surgeon and founder of Digestive Health Institute by Dr Muffi, Mumbai, which is the first Indian Centre for Excellence in Bariatric Surgery. He is the chairman of Institute of Minimal Invasive Surgical Sciences & Research Centre, Saifee Hospital, Mumbai and the president of IFSO- Asia Pacific chapter.

He was awarded the first international centre of excellence designation by the US based SRC (Surgical Review Corporation) Mumbai He has performed bariatric surgeries on several famous personalities, including the BJP President Nitin Gadkari, NCP's Nawab Malik, former State Cabinet minister Nitin Raut, BJP's Vinod Tawde and BJP leader Venkaiah Naidu.

Personal life 
Lakdawala was born and brought up in a Dawoodi Bohra family in Mumbai. He pursued his Masters in Surgery (M.S.) from B.Y.L. Nair Hospital and completed 3 years of residency programme in general surgery, MBBS from the Grant Medical College, University of Mumbai.

He lives in Mumbai with his wife, Priyanka Kaul. He has three Kids—Kiaan and Zhiaan and Kiara (from his first marriage to Aditi Gowitrikar).

Career 
Lakdawala underwent training in Bariatric Surgery with Raul Rosenthal, Cleveland Clinic, United States, 2006. He was also trained at the Unit of Gastro Surgery, with Piet Pattyn from the University of Ghent Hospital, Belgium, 2005 and also underwent Training in Advanced Laparoscopic Colorectal Surgery with Prof. Seon Hahn Kim, Seoul, Korea, 2004. 
He has also been a lecturer at B.Y.L.Nair Hospital- a teaching hospital in Mumbai.

He is one of the only Indian surgeon to have demonstrated live surgery in almost every Asian country. Till date he has performed the largest number of single incision sleeve gastrectomy surgeries in the world. He is the first surgeon to conduct laparoscopic gastric bypass in India. He also successfully operated on a 30-year-old woman with unexplained body aches, to find a live worm inside her bile duct.

Lakdawala has performed sleeve gastrectomy surgery on Jayesh Malukani, one of the youngest Indian patient who is a 17-year-old boy.
He has performed Bariatric Surgery on the heaviest man in Asia who weighed all of 285 kg (627 pounds) in Tianjen, China. He also successfully operated on Eman Ahmed, an Egyptian woman considered to be the heaviest in the world.

Positions 
Chairman, Position Statement Committee, International Federation of the Society of Obesity and Metabolic Disorders (IFSO)
Board Member, AETF - Asia Endosurgery Task Force (AETF)
Member, Asia Pacific Metabolic and Bariatric Surgery Society (APMBSS)
Director, Asian Consensus Meeting on Metabolic Surgery (ACMOMS)
Head, Dept. of Minimal Access and Bariatric Surgery, Saifee Hospital, Mumbai
Head, Expert Advisory Board for the Men’s Health Magazine

Awards 
He was awarded 'Humanitarian of the year' by the All India Human Rights Association in 2007 and a Silver Medal at Shirin Mehtaji Oration for ‘Obstructive Jaundice’ in 1996. He was also awarded as the Gold Medallist in Anatomy at First Year MBBS.

References 

Indian surgeons
Indian Ismailis
Dawoodi Bohras
Living people
Medical doctors from Mumbai
Year of birth missing (living people)